is a Japanese name.

Place Name
 Mount Mikami, a mountain in Yasu City, Shiga Prefecture, Japan
 Mikami Shrine, a temple at the foot of Mount Mikami

Surname
Notable people with the surname include:

Kyohei Mikami, Japanese wrestler
Masataka Mikami (born 1988), Japanese rugby union player
, Japanese golfer
, Japanese diver
Shinji Mikami, Japanese video game designer
, Japanese women's footballer
Takayuki Mikami, Japanese karateka
, Japanese baseball player
, Japanese AV actress and idol singer

Fictional characters
Teru Mikami of Death Note
Ryo Mikami of Kamen Rider Blade

See also
Ghost Sweeper Mikami, Japanese manga series

Japanese-language surnames